Mathilde Carré (30 June 1908 –30 May 2007), née Mathilde Lucie Bélard and known as "La Chatte", was a French Resistance agent during World War II who betrayed and turned double agent.

Early life
Carré was born in Le Creusot, Saône-et-Loire. In the 1930s she attended Sorbonne University and became a teacher. After her marriage, she moved to Algeria with her husband, Maurice Carré, who was later killed in World War II, during the Italian campaign.

World War II
She returned to France, worked as a nurse and witnessed her country fall to the Germans. In 1940, she met Polish Air Force Captain Roman Czerniawski, whose cryptonym was "Walenty" to the Poles and "Armand" or "Victor" to the French. Carré, who had contacts with the Vichy Second Bureau, joined the headquarters section of his Franco-Polish Interallié espionage network, based in Paris under the cryptonym "Victoire" (as all of the headquarters section staff had "V" initial names in a network that named its agents and their sectors or areas of coverage for given names grouped by the letters of the alphabet), but she was nicknamed La Chatte, ("The She-cat") for her feline predatory and stealthy propensities.

On 17 November 1941, the Abwehr's Hugo Bleicher arrested Czerniawski, Carré and many other members of Interallié. They had been uncovered when an informant in Normandy had been exposed to the Gestapo. She was interrogated by him, threatened with death, offered a financial reward and agreed to become a double agent herself and to reveal all of the members of the network known to her. She began to work for Germans continuing to use the codename Victoire and may also have become Bleicher's mistress.

According to Pierre de Vomécourt, an agent of the Special Operations Executive (SOE), he and a Resistance contact began to suspect her. When he confronted Carré, who had become his mistress, she confessed, and they together planned to outwit the Abwehr.

She claimed she convinced Bleicher and, through him, his superiors, to send her to London to infiltrate the SOE. In February 1942, she was exfiltrated to London with de Vomécourt by a naval vessel from a cove in Locquirec. MI5 interrogated her about Abwehr techniques and played back her radio link for a period until her usefulness was exhausted. Then, she was arrested and taken first to HM Prison Holloway and then to HM Prison Aylesbury for the rest of the war, where she acted as an informant against other detainees.

Postwar
After the war, Carré was deported to France where she faced charges for treason. At the trial, which started on 3 January 1949, the prosecution read from her diary: "What I wanted most was a good meal, a man, and, once more, Mozart's Requiem." She was defended by her wartime commander, Paul Archard but was sentenced to death on 7 January 1949. Three months later, the sentence was commuted to 20 years in jail.

Carré was released in September 1954. She published an account of her life in J'ai été "La Chatte" (1959; revised in 1975 as On m'appelait la Chatte ("I Was Called the Cat")) in which she denied many claims that had been made about her and her activities during the war.

She died in Paris at the age of 98.

References

Sources
 Jacques Baumel, Résister (mentions the betrayal )
 
  Based on extensive interviews London and Paris.
 Paine, Lauran (1976). Mathilde Carré: Double Agent. London: Hale; .

1908 births
2007 deaths
People from Le Creusot
University of Paris alumni
Female wartime spies
Double agents
Gestapo personnel
French Resistance members
Female resistance members of World War II
French collaborators with Nazi Germany
French prisoners sentenced to death
World War II spies for Germany
French women in World War II
People convicted of treason against France
Prisoners sentenced to death by France
20th-century French women
Women sentenced to death